Borazjan castle is a historical castle, caravanserai located in Dashtestan County in Bushehr Province, The longevity of this fortress dates back to the Qajar dynasty.

References 

Castles in Iran
Qajar castles